Harry Adair (born 14 December 1997) is an English cricketer. He made his first-class debut on 1 April 2018 for Oxford MCCU against Kent as part of the Marylebone Cricket Club University fixtures. He made his Twenty20 debut on 23 August 2019, for Durham in the 2019 t20 Blast.

References

External links
 

1997 births
Living people
English cricketers
Durham cricketers
Oxford MCCU cricketers
Oxfordshire cricketers
Cricketers from Chesterfield, Derbyshire